Hillary Monahan is an American author, best known for her New York Times-bestselling debut novel MARY: The Summoning. Her work includes young adult, horror, urban fantasy, and romance novels. She has published more than a dozen books. Her other pen names include Thea de Salle and Eva Darrows.

Personal 
Monahan describes herself as a horror author first. Her fifth young adult novel The Hollow Girl is inspired by her Welsh Romany heritage.

Selected works 
Novels

As Hillary Monahan

Monahan's first young adult novel, MARY: The Summoning, is the first in a series and about a group of teens who attempt to summon a ghost that turns out to be Bloody Mary and starts to follow them. It was published by Disney-Hyperion in 2014 and hit the New York Times bestseller list, debuting at #2. A sequel, MARY: Unleashed, was published in 2015.

Monahan's adult fantasy debut, Snake Eyes, is the third novel in the Gods & Monsters series, whose previous two novels were written by Chuck Wendig and Steven Blackmoore. Snake Eyes is about a Lamia, a snake monster from Greek mythology, who leaves her mother and finds herself in a battle between mythological creatures. It was published by Abaddon in 2016.

Her fifth young adult novel and third standalone, The Hollow Girl, is about a Welsh Romani teen who gruesomely gets revenge on the boy who raped her, using violence and magic. It was published by Delacorte in 2017.

As Eva Darrows

Her first standalone young adult novel, The Awesome was published under the pen name Eva Darrows by Ravenstone in 2015. It's about a seventeen-year-old ghost hunter on a quest to lose her virginity in order to be able to hunt vampires. The Awesome received a starred review from Publishers Weekly.

As Thea de Salle

Monahan's first adult romance series, NOLA Nights, a three-book series starting with The King of Bourbon Street, was published in 2017 by Pocket Star, under the pen name Thea de Salle.

Short stories

Monahan will also contributing a short story to His Hideous Heart, a 2019 anthology of retellings of Edgar Allan Poe stories, edited by Dahlia Adler, and published by Flatiron Books. Her writing will appear alongside authors Kendare Blake, Rin Chupeco, Lamar Giles, Tiffany D. Jackson, and Stephanie Kuehn, among others.

Bibliography 
As Hillary Monahan

Novels

Young Adult

 Bloody Mary Series

 MARY: The Summoning (Disney Hyperion, 2014)
 MARY: Unleashed (Disney Hyperion, 2015)

 The Hollow Girl (Delacorte Press, 2017)

Fantasy

 Gods & Monsters

 Snake Eyes (Abaddon, 2016)

As Eva Darrows

Young Adult

 The Awesome (Ravenstone, 2015)
 Dead Little Mean Girl (Harlequin Teen, 2017)
 Belly Up (Inkyard Press, 2019)

As Thea De Salle

Romance

NOLA Nights Series

 The King of Bourbon Street (Pocket Star, 2017)
 The Queen of Dauphine Street (Pocket Star, 2017)
 The Lady of Royale Street (Pocket Star, 2017)

References 

Year of birth missing (living people)
Living people
Women writers of young adult literature
LGBT Romani people
American LGBT writers
Romani writers
Welsh Romani people
American horror novelists
American fantasy writers
American Romani people